The Hilger Block is a historic commercial building located at 361 S. Pierre St. in Pierre, South Dakota. J.D. Hilger built the building in 1883 to use as a clothing store. The building was the first brick commercial block in Pierre. The building was designed in the Italianate style and features a bracketed cornice with dentils and moldings, long and narrow windows with ornamental hoods, and a flat parapet along the roofline. As West Pierre became the main business district of Pierre, the Hilger Block became a desirable location for businesses; by 1890, it had twelve tenants, with businesses on the first floor and professional offices on the second.

The building was added to the National Register of Historic Places on May 31, 2006.

References

Commercial buildings on the National Register of Historic Places in South Dakota
Italianate architecture in South Dakota
Commercial buildings completed in 1883
Buildings and structures in Pierre, South Dakota
National Register of Historic Places in Pierre, South Dakota